Ognon is a former commune in the Oise department in northern France. On 1 January 2019, it was merged into the new commune Villers-Saint-Frambourg-Ognon.

See also
Communes of the Oise department

References

Former communes of Oise
Populated places disestablished in 2019